Douglas Waugh Morgan (9 March 1947 – 5 April 2020) was a Scotland international rugby union player. In 1977 he toured New Zealand with the British and Irish Lions and at the time played club rugby for Stewart's Melville FP.

Rugby Union career

Amateur career

He played for Stewart's Melville.

Provincial career

He was capped by Edinburgh District.

International career

Morgan played 21 full internationals for Scotland between 1973 and 1978 and captained the team in the 1978 Five Nations Championship. He was also capped twice by the Lions against New Zealand on the 1977 tour. After retiring as a player Morgan moved into coaching and coached the Scotland team from 1993 to 1995.

Death

He died on 4 April 2020, aged 73.

References

1947 births
2020 deaths
Scottish rugby union players
British & Irish Lions rugby union players from Scotland
Rugby union scrum-halves
Scotland international rugby union players
Stewart's Melville RFC players
Rugby union players from Edinburgh
Edinburgh District (rugby union) players